The Pioneer Memorial Museum is in Salt Lake City, Utah, United States.

The statue of Eliza R. Snow and Lest We Forget are installed outside the building.

See also
 Daughters of Utah Pioneers

References

External links

Museums in Salt Lake City